Sarshiv Rural District is a rural district (dehestan) in Sarshiv District, Marivan County, Kurdistan Province, Iran. At the 2006 census, its population was 5,321, in 1,081 families. The rural district has 25 villages.

References 

Rural Districts of Kurdistan Province
Marivan County